1942 is a 2001 EP release from Soul-Junk.

Track listing

Credits
Glen Galaxy – CTR, Singing, Farfisa, Keys, Breaking glass
Jon Galaxy – Bass, Hand concocted drum machine
Slo-Ro – Banjo, Clarinet, Trumpet, Loops, Electronics, Toy piano, Acoustic guitar, Backup singing
Sufjan Stevens – Drums, Melodica, Keys, Handclaps, Bells, Backup singing
Daniel Smith – Bass on "3 Fascinating Smells," Tambourines, Toy piano, Handclaps, Backup singing
Micah Ortega – Backup singing
Chris Palladino – Synth on "Soon Seated"
Lenny Smith – Backup singing
Songs by Glen
Artwork – Glen & Jude
Mastering – Drew Anderson @ Masterdisk
Produced by Daniel Smith

References

External links
Samples from 1942

Soul-Junk EPs
2001 EPs
Sounds Familyre Records EPs